Sloane Stephens was the defending champion, but lost in the first round to Risa Ozaki.

Yanina Wickmayer won the title, defeating Lauren Davis in the final, 6–4, 6–2.

Seeds

Draw

Finals

Top half

Bottom half

Qualifying

Seeds

Qualifiers

Lucky losers
  Hiroko Kuwata

Draw

First qualifier

Second qualifier

Third qualifier

Fourth qualifier

References
Main Draw
Qualifying Draw

Citi Open - Women's Singles